This is a list of provincial parks in the Canadian province of Nova Scotia. These provincial parks are maintained by the Nova Scotia Provincial Parks branch of the Department of Natural Resources. For a list of protected areas in Nova Scotia, see the List of protected areas of Nova Scotia.

Annapolis County

Antigonish County

Cape Breton County

Colchester County

Cumberland County

Digby County

Guysborough County

Halifax County

Hants County

Inverness County

Kings County

Lunenburg County

Pictou County

Queens County

Richmond County

Shelburne County

Victoria County

Yarmouth County

External links 
 Nova Scotia Parks
 Our Parks and Protected Areas: A Plan for Nova Scotia

Nova Scotia
Provincial parks
Nova Scotia